Capela is the name of a neighborhood located on the west side of the town of Râmnicu Vâlcea in Romania. Its name is derived from the Capela Hill, which lies to the west of the town.

Râmnicu Vâlcea